Cattrall is a surname. Notable people with the surname include:

Kim Cattrall (born 1956), English-born Canadian actress
Robert Cattrall (born 1957), British field hockey player

See also
Catterall (surname)